Irina Alexandrovna Medvedeva (born 14 August 1982) is a Russian and Belarusian actress. She has been member of cast of Russian sketch shows Dear broadcast, 6 frames and Sled.  Medvedeva was married to Ruslan Alekhno from 2009 until 2011.

Biography 
Irina Medvedeva was born in Babruysk, Mogilev Region, Byelorussian SSR, Soviet Union. 

On the silver screen debut in 1999, a cameo role in the TV series Komsomol "Express help". In 2003-2004 she worked as an actress Theatre of Belarusian Army.

In April 2004, he won a reality TV channel REN-TV "Faculty of humor". In 2005 it became part of the group of actors sketch show "Dear broadcast" (REN TV). From 2006 until the closure of the program in early 2014 starred in the sketch show "6 frames" on STS (TV channel). From 8 September to 15 December 2013 in tandem with a figure skater Povilas Vanagas - participant of the First Channel television show "Ice Age 4". From 1 to September 11, 2014 led the talk show "On the most important thing", Sergei Agapkin.

Personal life 
On July 18, 2009 Irina married Ruslan Alekhno, singer and participant of the TV project People's Artist. In 2011, they officially divorced.

On July 20, 2018 Irina married Guillaume Bouché, French businessman.

Filmography

Theatre

References

External links 

 

1982 births
Living people
People from Babruysk
Belarusian film actresses
Belarusian television actresses
Belarusian stage actresses
Russian film actresses
Russian television actresses
Russian stage actresses
21st-century Belarusian women singers
Russian women comedians
20th-century Belarusian actresses
21st-century Belarusian actresses
Belarusian State Academy of Arts alumni